Traian Ioachim Cihărean (born 13 July 1969) is a retired flyweight weightlifter from Romania. He competed at the 1988, 1992 and 1996 Olympics and won a bronze medal in 1992, placing fifth-sixth on other occasions. Cihărean won the European title in 1991 and finished third at the 1989 World Championships. His younger brother Marius is also a former Olympic weightlifter.

References

1969 births
Living people
Olympic bronze medalists for Romania
Olympic weightlifters of Romania
Romanian male weightlifters
Weightlifters at the 1988 Summer Olympics
Weightlifters at the 1992 Summer Olympics
Weightlifters at the 1996 Summer Olympics
Olympic medalists in weightlifting
Medalists at the 1992 Summer Olympics
European Weightlifting Championships medalists
World Weightlifting Championships medalists
20th-century Romanian people